Giannino Bulzone (9 May 1911 – 7 July 1987) was an Italian long-distance runner. He competed in the marathon at the 1936 Summer Olympics.

References

External links
 

1911 births
1987 deaths
Athletes (track and field) at the 1936 Summer Olympics
Italian male long-distance runners
Italian male marathon runners
Olympic athletes of Italy
People from Gaeta
Sportspeople from the Province of Latina